Nina Cutro-Kelly (born 12 December 1984) is an American international level judoka. She competes in both judo and sambo. She competed in the women's +78 kg event at the 2020 Summer Olympics in Tokyo, Japan.

Cutro-Kelly is a member of Team USA, having competed in nine world championships in the sport of Judo. She competes as a heavyweight, and is a 5th degree black belt. Nina was 2022 Deaflympic Champion in Judo in +78kg. 

Cutro-Kelly is a graduate of Union College in Schenectady, NY and has a Master's Degree from Université de Rennes in Rennes, France. She is openly bisexual.

References

External links
 

American female judoka
Sportspeople from Albany, New York
Living people
1984 births
Pan American Games medalists in judo
Pan American Games bronze medalists for the United States
Medalists at the 2015 Pan American Games
Judoka at the 2015 Pan American Games
Judoka at the 2019 Pan American Games
Judoka at the 2020 Summer Olympics
Olympic judoka of the United States
American LGBT sportspeople
21st-century American women